The Hungarian Historical Society is a learned society in Hungary, established in 1867. Its main responsibilities are the cultivation of the History of Hungary, dissemination of scientific findings, supporting research and development and representing the history of Hungary domestically and around the world.

Aims
The historical society's aims are:

Cultivating and promoting Hungarian historiography and history, organizing archival research and publishing national historical sources according to the unpolitical spirituality.
Spreading the recent study results of the Hungarian and – as far as possible – Universal History to reach the widest audience.
Its traditional aims are to become a large, informal "guild" to defend and represent the interests of the Hungarian historians, the educators of the history of Hungary and those people who are interested in history.

Motto

 "Emlékezzünk régiekről!″ (Remember the Old Ones)

History
The Hungarian Historical Society was established on May 15, 1867. The first session to establish the society was held on 2 February 1867 which was summoned by Arnold Ipolyi. Here they discussed the ways in which the society was formed and chose a committee to elaborate the basic rules. The first General Assembly was held with 300 members at the Hungarian Academy of Sciences. On 13 June Imre Mikó was elected to the chairman of the society, and acted as a leader until 1876.

21st century
The goal of the new millennium was that the society renewed the old traditions of conferences and congresses related to the various significant anniversaries, and it began monthly talk series about "Critical Issues in the national history" and the modernization of Periodical Századok. The society celebrated its 150th anniversary on May 15, 2017, and on this occasion a memorial conference was held at the Hungarian Academy of Sciences on 6 December 2017.

Organisation
The management and the Board of Directors is run by the General Assembly. The 20 members of the Board of Directors are elected by the ordinary Annual General Assembly meeting among regular members by secret ballot. The management is consisting of nine members: the chairperson, the five deputy chairpersons among whom one serves as an acting chairperson, the general secretary, the chairman of the Editorial Board of Periodical Századok and its editor-in-chief.

Committees
Regional committees: Borsod-Abaúj-Zemplén County Committee, Southern Great Plain Committee, Southern Transdanubia Committee, Hajdú-Bihar County Committee, Heves County Committee, Eastern Transdanubia Committee, Western Transdanubia Committee, Szabolcs-Szatmár-Bereg County Committee.
Specialized sections: Information history Section, Doctorandus Section, László Vekerdy Section.
Professional committees (sections): Church history Section, Environmental history Section, Women's history Section, Teacher's Section.

Leadership

Chairpersons

Current Management

Types of the Publications of the Society
The society published several journals, periodicals and books from its establishment, 1867, e.g monographs, book series, sourcebooks, study books, biographies, mémoires, e.g. about significant Hungarian historical persons like Ladislaus IV of Hungary, Louis I of Hungary, Mary, Queen of Hungary, Matthias Corvinus, Tamás Bakócz, Sigismund Rákóczi, Péter Pázmány, Gabriel Bethlen, Miklós Zrínyi, George II Rákóczi, Emeric Thököly. In 1867 it established its most important periodical named Századok (Centuries) which has survived until now.

References

Bibliography

External links

 
 

Historical societies
Hungarian culture
Learned societies of Hungary
Buildings and structures in Budapest
Organizations established in 1867
Scientific organizations established in 1867
1867 establishments in Hungary